The Best Things in Life (五福到) is a Singaporean drama which aired on Channel 8. It stars Chen Hanwei, Cynthia Koh, Tracy Lee, Terence Cao, Zhang Yaodong, Ya Hui, Phyllis Quek, Ong Ai Leng, Darren Lim & Desmond Tan as the casts if the series. It debuted on 17 March 2010 and consists of 20 episodes.

Cast
Chen Hanwei as Chen Wufu (陈五福)
Cynthia Koh as Chen Jiaxin (陈家欣)
Tracy Lee as Chen Jiayi (陈家宜)
Ya Hui as Chen Jiahui (陈家慧)
Terence Cao as Song Daming (宋达明)
Zhang Yaodong as Bai Chuanyi (白传一)
Darren Lim as Luo Jianguo (罗建国)
Ong Ai Leng as Ah Zhu (阿珠)
Phyllis Quek as Dream
Desmond Tan as Beethoven
Romeo Tan as Dream's younger brother

Synopsis

Chen Wufu (Chen Hanwei) is an orphan. He was adopted by a kind fisherman and his wife who have three daughters. Their daughters left for Singapore to work and subsequently married and settled in the city, leaving Wufu to care for his parents. Wufu is a kind-hearted man with simple needs, but his parents urged him to leave for the city to eke out his own living. His naive and trusting ways leads to many hilarious situations when he arrives in the city.

Wu Fu’s eldest sister, Chen Jiaxin (Cynthia Koh), holds three jobs to maximize her earning potential. When she loses her money in the stock market, she blames second sister Chen Jiayi (Tracy Lee) who encourages her to invest. Wu Fu’s attempts to mediate only make matters worse, Jiaxin falls out with her husband, Jiayi’s wedding is nearly ruined, and youngest sister Chen Jiahui’s (Ya Hui) career and love life also takes a hit from his meddling.

The three sisters are furious and try to get rid of him, but eventually, Wufu’s sincerity and steadfastness touches them. This comedy drama shows the importance of family ties and tugs the heart-string with its touching story.

References

External links
The Best Things In Life on MediaCorp

Singapore Chinese dramas
2010 Singaporean television series debuts
2010 Singaporean television series endings
Channel 8 (Singapore) original programming